Yulia Zakirovna Karimova (born 22 April 1994) is a Russian sport shooter of Tatar descent.

She participated at the 2018 ISSF World Shooting Championships, winning two medals, one of which was a gold medal in 50 m rifle 3 positions.

References

External links

Living people
1994 births
Russian female sport shooters
ISSF rifle shooters
European Games gold medalists for Russia
Shooters at the 2015 European Games
Shooters at the 2019 European Games
European Games medalists in shooting
Olympic shooters of Russia
Shooters at the 2020 Summer Olympics
Medalists at the 2020 Summer Olympics
Olympic bronze medalists for the Russian Olympic Committee athletes
Olympic medalists in shooting
Volga Tatars
Tatar sportspeople
Tatar people of Russia
Sportspeople from Izhevsk
21st-century Russian women